Roman White is a music video and film director who has directed most of Carrie Underwood's videos. He has also directed music videos for Taylor Swift, Kelly Clarkson, Florida Georgia Line, Kelsea Ballerini, Cassadee Pope, Josh Groban, Easton Corbin, Thomas Rhett, Lauren Alaina, Lady A, Brett Young, Danielle Bradbery, Kellie Pickler, Carly Pearce, Hunter Hayes, Maddie & Tae, Maren Morris, Jennette McCurdy, Justin Bieber and more.

White directed his motion picture debut film Summer Forever, and the 2021 Netflix release A Week Away.

Videos directed

115 music videos are currently listed here.

References

External links

Official site

American music video directors
Living people
Year of birth missing (living people)
Place of birth missing (living people)